= National Historic District =

National Historic District may refer to:

- National Historic Landmark District, a district officially recognized by the United States government for its national-level historical significance
- National Historic Sites of Canada, places designated by Canada's federal Minister of the Environment as being of national historic significance
- National Register of Historic Places historic district, in the United States a place listed as a National Register of Historic Places property type

== See also ==
- Historic district, a section of a city considered valuable for historical or architectural reasons
